The 2007 Women's EuroHockey Nations Challenge I was the second edition of the Women's EuroHockey Nations Challenge I, the third level of the women's European field hockey championships organized by the European Hockey Federation. It was held in Zagreb, Croatia from 2 to 8 September 2007.

Wales won its first EuroHockey Nations Challenge I title and were promoted to the 2011 EuroHockey Nations Trophy together with the runners-up Poland.

Qualified teams

Preliminary round

Pool A

Pool B

Classification round

Fifth to seventh place classification
The points obtained in the preliminary round against the other team are taken over.

First to fourth place classification

Semi-finals

Third place game

Final

Final standings

See also
2007 Men's EuroHockey Nations Challenge I
2007 Women's EuroHockey Nations Trophy

References

Women's EuroHockey Championship III
Women 3
EuroHockey Nations Challenge I
EuroHockey Nations Challenge I
Sports competitions in Zagreb
International women's field hockey competitions hosted by Croatia
EuroHockey Nations Challenge I
2000s in Zagreb